In Mexican popular culture, a  is a disc jockey, engineer or entertainer that plays recorded music in public, mainly cumbia, salsa, guaracha and their subgenres. The term includes professionals, semiprofessionals and amateur audio, light and video equipment owners (the ) used to organize or participate in public dancing events (also called  events) and all the communities behind this urban culture, the  movement.

Some of its distinctive features are the reproduction of recorded music from Latin genres such as cumbia, salsa, bachata and guaracha, over which the  sends shout-outs and messages to the public simultaneously with the music playing. The advertising and identity of the sounds has its own aesthetic, which is used to announce events permanently in urban spaces in Mexico. In addition to street performances,  are hired for private parties. Likewise  has a strong relationship with Colombian symbols and cultural expressions such as cumbia and vallenato.  honors Colombian heritage including using names of Colombian cities in their names and the flag of Colombia in their symbols and promotions.

References 

Mexican culture